Sidney Godolphin, 1st Earl of Godolphin,  (15 June 1645 – 15 September 1712) was a leading British politician of the late 17th and the early 18th centuries. He was a Privy Councillor and Secretary of State for the Northern Department before he attained real power as First Lord of the Treasury. He was instrumental in negotiating and passing the Acts of Union 1707 with Scotland, which created the Kingdom of Great Britain. He had many other roles, including that of Governor of Scilly.

Family and early career
He came from an ancient Cornish family as the son of Sir Francis Godolphin (1605–1667) and nephew of the poet Sidney Godolphin. At the Restoration, he was introduced into the royal household by King Charles II of England, whose favourite he had become, and he also entered the House of Commons as member for Helston, in Cornwall. Although he spoke few words before the House, they were so to the point that he "gradually acquired a reputation as its chief if not its only financial authority". In 1668, he was a successful intermediary between the King and his sister Henrietta Anne, the wife of the Duke of Orléans, to secure an agreement with King Louis XIV of France to reject England's Dutch allies in return for French money. In 1669, he was awarded a 31-year lease on all tin mines in Rialton and Retraigh in Cornwall. In 1670, Godolphin was appointed Groom of the Bedchamber along with a pension of £500 per annum. He held that post until 1678. The King said that he valued  Godolphin because he was "never in the way and never out of the way".

Charles appointed Godolphin envoy-extraordinary to Louis XIV in 1672 to reassure France of Charles's allegiance before Louis attacked the Dutch. Godolphin was with Louis in the field during the Franco-Dutch War but was unimpressed with his capabilities as a military commander.

In March 1679, Godolphin was appointed a member of the Privy Council and in September was promoted, along with Viscount Hyde (afterwards Earl of Rochester) and the Earl of Sunderland, to the chief management of affairs.

Exclusion and revolution
Although he voted for the Exclusion Bill in 1680, which, if successfully enacted, would have prevented the Catholic Duke of York from assuming the throne, he continued in office after the dismissal of Sunderland, and in September 1684, he was created Baron Godolphin of Rialton and succeeded Rochester as First Lord of the Treasury. After the accession of James II, he was made chamberlain to the queen, Mary of Modena, and, along with Rochester and Sunderland, enjoyed the king's special confidence. In 1687 he was named commissioner of the treasury. Although Parliament had voted to grant James II £6,000,000, Godolphin was involved in the payment of approximately £125,000 to James II by Louis XIV in return for James's support for Louis. The historian David Ogg has written, "James and his two ministers, Rochester and Godolphin, were prepared to barter the independence of England for a sum little more than a sixtieth part of that granted by the national legislature".

He was present at the birth of the Old Pretender, but during the ensuing controversy as to whether or not the birth was genuine, he said diplomatically that he had no useful information to contribute, as he was too far from the bed to see anything. He was one of the council of five appointed by King James to represent him in London when James went to battle after the landing of William of Orange in England, and he, along with Lord Halifax and Lord Nottingham, was afterwards appointed a commissioner to negotiate with the prince. On the accession of William, he obtained only the third seat at the treasury board but was in control of affairs. He retired in March 1690 but was recalled in November and appointed first lord.

Career under William III and Queen Anne
While holding the office he for several years continued, in conjunction with John Churchill (the future Duke of Marlborough), a secret correspondence with James II and is said to have disclosed to James intelligence regarding the intended expedition against Brest. Godolphin was a Tory by inheritance and was thought to have a romantic admiration for the wife of James II. After Fenwick's confession in 1696 regarding the attempted assassination of William III, Godolphin, who was compromised, tendered his resignation, but when the Tories came into power in 1700, he was again appointed First Lord of the Treasury. Though not technically a favourite with Queen Anne, he was after her accession appointed Lord Treasurer on the strong recommendation of Marlborough, and he retained the office for eight years. Sarah Churchill later wrote that if Anne came to learn anything about politics and statecraft, it was entirely from Godolphin's mentoring. In 1704, he was also made a Knight of the Garter, and in December 1706, he was created Viscount Rialton and Earl of Godolphin.

Though a Tory, he had an active share in the intrigues that gradually led to the predominance of the Whigs in alliance with Marlborough: the two were nicknamed "the Duumvirs". The influence of the Marlboroughs with the queen was, however, gradually supplanted by that of Abigail Masham and Robert Harley (later Earl of Oxford), and with the fortunes of the Marlboroughs, those of Godolphin were indissolubly united. The Queen initially relied heavily on his guidance, but relations became strained. Eventually, when he threatened to resign, she said coldly, "Do as you please... there are many to take your place". The services of both Marlborough and Godolphin were so appreciated by the nation that for a time, they regarded the loss of the queen's favour with indifference and even in 1708 to procure the expulsion of Harley from office. However, after the High Tory reaction to the impeachment of Henry Sacheverell, who had abused Godolphin under the name of Volpone, Anne made use of the opportunity to get rid of Marlborough by abruptly dismissing Godolphin from office on 7 August 1710 in tones as cold and ungrateful as those that she later used with Marlborough. Godolphin died two years later and his estate was worth more than £12,000. He is buried in the south aisle of the nave of Westminster Abbey.  On the wall is a bust of him by the sculptor Francis Bird.

Marriage and succession
On 16 May 1675, Godolphin married Margaret Blagge, daughter of Thomas Blagge, the pious lady whose life was written by John Evelyn in his book The Life of Mrs Godolphin. She died in childbirth in 1678 bearing his only son, and Godolphin never remarried. Margaret is buried at Breage, Cornwall, the spot being marked by a small brass floor plaque erected by the Duke of Leeds. Progeny:
Francis Godolphin, 2nd Earl of Godolphin (1678–1766)

Gallery

Legacy

The Whig historian Lord Macaulay said of Godolphin in 1848:

He was laborious, clear-headed, and profoundly versed in the details of finance. Every government, therefore, found him an useful servant; and there was nothing in his opinions or in his character which could prevent him from serving any government. “Sidney Godolphin,” said Charles, “is never in the way, and never out of the way.” This pointed remark goes far to explain Godolphin's extraordinary success in life. He acted at different times with both the great political parties; but he never shared in the passions of either. Like most men of cautious tempers and prosperous fortunes, he had a strong disposition to support whatever existed. He disliked revolutions, and, for the same reason for which he disliked revolutions, he disliked counter-revolutions. His deportment was remarkably grave and reserved, but his personal tastes were low and frivolous; and most of the time which he could save from public business was spent in racing, cardplaying, and cockfighting.

In the opinion of Julian Hoppitt, Godolphin "tirelessly oversaw the dramatic expansion of key areas of the State, providing an element of integrity, continuity, and predictability in a very uncertain environment. He was in a very real sense Marlborough's partner and together the duumvirs oversaw the glory days of the War of the Spanish Succession. In a very real sense Marlborough's dismissal and Godolphin's death the following year marked the end of an era". Roy Sundstrom asserted that Godolphin is an important figure in the history of England:

[…] first he raised the money required to blunt French hegemony in Europe and thus preserved the British constitution and the protestant monarchy; second he was instrumental in planning the military and diplomatic strategy that ultimately defeated Louis XIV; third, as lord high treasurer, he worked to make the Treasury more efficient and attempted to weed out corruption—the Treasury as he left it served England well for the remainder of the eighteenth century; fourth he was instrumental in negotiating and passing the Act of Union with Scotland which created the united kingdom of Great Britain; and fifth he negotiated the creation of a unified East India Company, which would be instrumental in establishing British rule in India.

Notes

References

Primary sources

Secondary sources

External links

1645 births
1712 deaths
British Secretaries of State
Garter Knights appointed by Anne
Lord High Treasurers
Lord-Lieutenants of Cornwall
People from Breage, Cornwall
Members of the pre-1707 English Parliament for constituencies in Cornwall
Members of the Privy Council of England
Pages of Honour
Secretaries of State for the Northern Department
Sidney
English MPs 1661–1679
English MPs 1679
English MPs 1680–1681
English MPs 1681
Earls of Godolphin
Politicians from Cornwall
Peers of England created by Charles II
Governors of the Isles of Scilly
British and English royal favourites